American Youth Academy, previously the Islamic Academy of Florida, is a PreK-12 Islamic school in Tampa, Florida, United States, located in Temple Terrace (as of 2006).

History
Sami Al-Arian and others established the Islamic Academy of Florida. The school's students received scholarships from corporations, facilitated by the state of Florida. In February 2003 a grand jury in the United States federal legal system indicted Al-Arian on criminal charges related to terrorism. In July of that year the corporations ended their scholarships. Therefore, the original Islamic Academy sought a rebrand.

In August 2003 Islamic Academy failed to negotiate a merger with Universal Academy of Florida, the other area Islamic school. In January 2004 the board of the Islamic Academy decided to dissolve the school. A new board was formed for American Youth Academy, which took the Islamic Academy equipment and began renting the Islamic Academy building after Islamic Academy dissolved in May 2004. Most of the students stayed on at AYA. Magda Saleh, former principal of Universal Academy, became the principal of AYA. Corporations began giving scholarships to AYA students, though the scholarships did not entirely cover the tuition.

Student body
In the mid-2000s the school had around 200 students. Students came from Hillsborough, Manatee, Pasco, Polk, and Sarasota counties. In many of those counties there were no Islamic schools, so Muslim parents in those counties enrolled their children in AYA.

Transportation
Does not provide bus service. Parents transport their children.

References

External links
 American Youth Academy

High schools in Tampa, Florida
Public elementary schools in Florida
Public middle schools in Florida
Public high schools in Florida
Educational institutions established in 1992
1992 establishments in Florida

Islamic schools in Florida
Schools in Tampa, Florida